Heldrungen is a town and a former municipality in the Kyffhäuserkreis district, Thuringia, Germany. Since 1 January 2019, it is part of the town An der Schmücke.

Nearby rivers are the Unstrut and the Wipper.

It is known for its fortification with two water ditches, four vauban bastions and five rondells. In the center of the fortification is a Renaissance castle, which was built from 1512 to 1518. Today, the castle is used as a youth hostel.

Notable people
Notable people that were born or lived in Heldrungen include:
Ferdinand T. Yahr (1834–1910), American politician

References

External links
Official Homepage  in German 

Towns in Thuringia
Former municipalities in Thuringia
Kyffhäuserkreis